Semma is an Indian restaurant in New York City. The restaurant, operated by Roni Mazumdar and Chintan Pandya and their hospitality group Unapologetic Foods, replaced their first collaborative restaurant, Rahi. The restaurant received a Michelin Star in 2022 and has received positive reviews from restaurant critics.

History and focus
Rahi, the restaurant which previously occupied Semma's location, closed in September 2021. Semma opened on October 12, 2021. Vijay Kumar left his position as chef at the restaurant Rasa in California to become the chef at Semma. Kumar grew up in Tamil Nadu and designed the menu to focus on the foods of Southern India. Dishes on the menu, including the nathai pirattal (a snail dish) and a venison dish, were inspired by meals prepared by Kumar's family during his childhood. 

"Semma" means "fantastic" or "super" in Tamil. Mazumdar and Kumar have both said that patrons have thanked them for providing food and flavors which accurately capture cooking found in India.

The interior of the space was redone after the closure of Rahi, with a new design inspired by the Indian state of Kerala. The New York Times referred to the interior as having "tropical accents" and noted that wood ceilings "suggest" Keralan houseboats, known as kettuvallam. The restaurant's decor was designed by Wid Chapman Architects.

Reviews and accolades

Reviews
In a positive review, New York Times critic Pete Wells compared Semma favorably to other restaurants by Unapologetic Foods. Wells praised the "rustic cooking" featured at Adda and Dhamaka, Semma's "siblings" as their primary strength, while asserting that Semma was distinguished by its "chutneys...sauces...and spices" and its more extensive offerings.

In a review published by Eater, critic Robert Sietsema praised the restaurant for "aggressively challenging New York’s long-standing ideas about the scope and depth of Indian cuisine". Sietsema highlighted the Mangalore huukkosu, mulaikattiya thaniya, and erral thoku as several of his favorite dishes.

Hannah Albertine, in a review published by The Infatuation, praised the restaurant's decor and food.

Accolades
The restaurant was awarded a Michelin Star in 2022. The Infatuation included Semma on its list of the best new restaurants in New York City in 2021. The restaurant was included on a list published by The New York Times of the restaurants "loved most" by its critics in 2022. The publication Bon Appétit included Semma on its list of the best new restaurants of 2022.

See also
 List of Michelin starred restaurants in New York City

References

External links

2021 establishments in New York City
Indian restaurants in the United States
Restaurants in Manhattan
Greenwich Village
Indian-American culture in New York City
Michelin Guide starred restaurants in New York (state)